Xiangyang Liuji Airport  is an airport serving the city of Xiangyang in Hubei Province, China.

Airlines and destinations

See also
List of airports in China

References

Airports in Hubei
Xiangyang